Albert I may refer to:

People

Born before 1300
Albert I, Count of Vermandois (917–987)
Albert I, Count of Namur
Albert I of Moha
Albert I of Brandenburg, first margrave of Brandenburg
Albert I, Margrave of Meissen (1158–1195)
Albert I of Käfernburg, Archbishop of Magdeburg
Albert I of Pietengau
Albert I, Lord of Mecklenburg (after 1230–1265)
Albert I, Duke of Brunswick-Lüneburg (1236–1279), second duke of Brunswick-Lüneburg
Albert I of Germany (1255–1308), king of Germany and archduke of Austria
Albert I, Prince of Anhalt-Zerbst (–1316)

Born after 1300
Albert I, Duke of Bavaria (1336–1404), duke of Bavaria-Straubing, count of Holland, Hainault and Zealand
Albert I, Duke of Mecklenburg-Stargard
Albert I, Duke of Brunswick-Grubenhagen
Albert I, Duke of Münsterberg-Oels (1468–1511)
Albert I, Duke of Prussia (1490–1568), first Duke of Prussia
Albert I, Prince of Monaco (1848–1922)
Albert I of Belgium (1875–1934), king of the Belgians
Albert I Kalonji Ditunga (1929–2015), Congolese politician

Other uses
Albert I, the first monkey used in a subspace rocket launch, June 11, 1948

See also
Albert (given name)